Arthroleptis crusculum is a species of frog in the family Arthroleptidae.

Its natural habitats are high-altitude grassland, gallery forests, and the edges of marshes. It is threatened by habitat loss caused by mining, agriculture, and livestock farming.

References

crusculum
Amphibians described in 1950
Amphibians of West Africa
Taxa named by Fernand Angel
Taxonomy articles created by Polbot